Aspatharia subreniformis is a species of freshwater mussel in the family Iridinidae. It is endemic to Lake Malawi in Malawi.

References

Invertebrates of Malawi
Unionida
Molluscs described in 1867
Taxonomy articles created by Polbot
Fauna of Lake Malawi